Lieutenant Colonel José María Lemus López (22 July 1911 – 31 March 1993) was president of El Salvador from 14 September 1956 to 26 October 1960. Before becoming a president, he served as an undersecretary of defense and a minister of the interior.

Life and career

He was born into a family of humble beginnings in La Unión, El Salvador. He was undersecretary of defense from 1948-1949. As President Óscar Osorio's choice for the successor to presidency, he antagonized many by fighting against corruption. Having won the disputed election of 1956, he appointed prominent civilians into his government and allowed many exiles to return the country.

He was a member of the Party of Democratic Unification. He continued socio-economic reforms of his predecessor, but there was no improvement in the living standards of the working class. He promulgated the Tenant Law, which protects the rights of the renters of houses or "Mesones, called also Vecindades" (humble apartment units with shared bathrooms).  The law stipulating that landlords cannot increase the rent more than 10% every year made rent contract in houses obligatory with the objective of protecting the renter.

His government repealed the anti-sedition laws, therefore antagonizing the military. His government's decision to control the production of coffee infuriated the public. Soon after the Cuban revolution, there were widespread student protests. There was a subsequent roundup of dissidents and protesters.

Overthrow and death

Following these uncertainties, he was overthrown in a bloodless coup and a new, short-lived Junta government was formed consisting of three military (Miguel Ángel Castillo, César Yanes Urías, Rubén Alonso Rosales) and three civilian (Ricardo Falla Cáceres, Fabio Castillo Figueroa, Rene Fortín Magaña.)

After his exile, he lived in New York City until his death in San Jose, Costa Rica. He died of Hodgkin's lymphoma, leaving behind a wife and eight children.

References

 

Presidents of El Salvador
Leaders ousted by a coup
1993 deaths
1911 births
Salvadoran military personnel
Grand Crosses Special Class of the Order of Merit of the Federal Republic of Germany
Revolutionary Party of Democratic Unification politicians
Interior ministers of El Salvador
Salvadoran exiles
Salvadoran expatriates in the United States
Salvadoran expatriates in Costa Rica